Awake and Breathe is the second studio album by Irish girl group B*Witched, released on 18 October 1999. The album was recorded on the back of the success of their self-titled debut B*Witched, and marked a slight change in sound for the band, containing more dance-orientated and upbeat pop, rather than the teen pop direction of their first album. The single "Jesse Hold On" and "If It Don't Fit" also mark a change into the country side of pop, described by the band during ITV2's The Big Reunion as "sweet and shiny". Three singles were released from the album: "Jesse Hold On", "I Shall Be There" and "Jump Down". However, poor sales of the album and the third single, "Jump Down", resulted in the band being dropped by their record label, and Awake and Breathe becoming their final album, until they got back together in 2012.

Commercial performance
Awake and Breathe peaked at number five on the UK Albums Chart on the week of release, and was certified Platinum the same year. In other territories, the album was significantly less successful than B*Witched. In Australia, the album reached a lowly number 70, and reached number 27 in New Zealand, while B*Witched peaked within the top 10 in both of these countries. The album peaked at just number 91 on the US Billboard 200 albums chart, but sold enough to be certified Gold in January 2000. The three singles performed reasonably, with the lead single "Jesse Hold On" peaking at number four and being certified Silver, and the second and third singles, "I Shall Be There" and "Jump Down" respectively both peaking within the top 20. However, these performances was a far cry from B*Witcheds singles, all of which topped the UK Singles Chart.

Track listing

Notes
  signifies remix and additional production

Personnel

B*Witched
Lindsay Armaou – backing vocals
Edele Lynch – lead vocals
Keavy Lynch – backing vocals
Sinéad O'Carroll – backing vocals

Musicians
Erwin Keiles – guitar, bass guitar
Robert Hodgens – guitar
Anne Dudley – strings (arrangement)
Martin Simmons – harmonica
BJ Cole – pedal steel guitar
Miriam Stockley – additional vocals
Tessa Niles – additional vocals

Charts and certifications

Weekly charts

Year-end charts

Certifications

References

B*Witched albums
1999 albums
Albums produced by Cutfather